The Babonić family ( or Vodicsai) was an old and powerful Croatian noble family from the medieval Slavonia whose most notable members were Bans (viceroys) of Slavonia and Croatia.

History 
The first known member of this family by name is Stephen I, known as Babon († at the beginning of the 13th century). The original possessions of Babonić were located on the right bank of the Kupa river between today's Karlovac and Sisak. Their first important stronghold was the town of Steničnjak. They rise of the family began at the turn of the 12th and 13th centuries when they received enormous estates from the Kings of Hungary. At the time of their greatest power, they held huge area from Carniola to Vrbas and from Sava to Gvozd, which also included fortified towns of Medvedgrad, Susedgrad, Kostanjevica and Mehovo.

Family connections 
They were related by blood to the most powerful families of the region, Counts of Gorizia, Venetian Morosini family, Zrinski, Frankopan and the Bosnian Kotromanić royal family through intermarriages.

Ursini von Blagay 

At the beginning of the 13th century, when they acquired the Blagaj Castle in North Bosnia, they also adopted the name of Blagay at the same time, after the Blagay estate they possessed. Due to wish of connecting themselves to the oldest existing noble families of Europe, without any written proof, the family started to claim kinship to the House of Orsini, family that produced many Popes and Cardinals. As an homage to the that special connection, they added the name Ursini in front of their already existing name of Blagay and became Ursini von Blagay. After the marriage of Count Franz Ursini von Blagay (d. 1576) to Maria Magdalena, Baroness von Lamberg (1540-1580), they also became owners of Boštanj castle, which remained in their possession until the end of the 19th century. The Counts Ursini von Blagay, cadet branch of the Babonić family, resettled to neighboring Carniola in the late 16th century after the loss of their possessions in the Una Valley to the Ottomans and automatically became part of the Austrian nobility. In the 19th century, by virtue of marriage to the Billichgrätz family, they also became owners of Polhov Gradec Castle. Family members also had a prominent role in the Slovenian national revival in the 19th century. With the death of Count Ludwig Ursini von Balagy (1830-1897), the family died out in male line in 1897. After his death, the descendants of his sister, Baroness Mathilde von Lauer (1833-1922), who outlived him for another 25 years, as designated heirs and next of kin, adopted the family name and incorporated into their own, being Barons Lauer-Ursini von Blagay.

Family tree 
Below is the complete family tree based on Hungarian historian Pál Engel's Medieval Hungarian Genealogy (2001) and Attila Zsoldos' archontology (2011):

 Godemir
 Stephen I
 Babonega I
 Stephen II (fl. 1243–1256), Ban of Primorje (banus maritimus) (1243–1249)
 Stephen III (fl. 1273–1300), Ban of Slavonia (in or before 1295), Krajna branch
 Ladislaus (fl. 1293)
 Stephen V (fl. 1293)
 Henry (fl. 1345)
 Stephen VI (fl. 1345)
 Radoslav I (fl. 1273–1294), Ban of Slavonia (1288, 1292, 1294)
 Babonega II (fl. 1249–1256)
 Nicholas I (fl. 1278–1292)
 Stephen IV (fl. 1278–1316), Ban of Slavonia (1299; 1310–1316), Krupa branch (Krupski)
 George (fl. 1321–1336)
 John II (fl. 1321–1328)
 Denis (fl. 1321–1370)
 Paul (fl. 1321–1381), died without heirs
 John I (fl. 1284–1334), Ban of Slavonia (1317–1322), Ban of Croatia and Dalmatia (1322)
 a daughter (fl. 1328), married Peter II Kőszegi, the ancestor of the Herceg de Szekcső family
 Otto (fl. 1284–1300)
 Radoslav II (fl. 1284–1314)
 Nicholas II (fl. 1321–1330)
 Dujam (fl. 1321–1369), ancestor of the Blagay family, later became Counts Ursini von Blagay; extinct in male line in 1897

References

Sources

Croatian noble families
Medieval Croatian nobility
12th-century Croatian nobility
13th-century Croatian nobility
14th-century Croatian nobility
Hungarian nobility
History of Bosanska Krajina